Brian Geoffrey Hutton (January 1, 1935 – August 19, 2014) was an American actor and film director whose notable credits are for the action films Where Eagles Dare (1968) and Kelly's Heroes (1970).

Acting career
Hutton was born in New York City and studied at the Actors Studio. He had a brief acting career between 1954 and 1962, including an appearance as an army deserter in the episode "Custer" in Gunsmoke (series 2, 1956). He played a young gunslinger, Billy Benson in season 2, episode 4 of "The Rifleman".  He made two guest appearances on Perry Mason in 1957: as Rod Gleason in "The Case of the Sulky Girl" and as a parking attendant in "The Case of the Moth-Eaten Mink." His last television appearance was in the series Archer in 1975.

In 1958, Hutton played a young gunfighter named The Kid in the episode "Yampa Crossing" of the western series Sugarfoot. The following year, he portrayed a remorseful defendant on trial for causing a traffic death in Alfred Hitchcock Presents (the episode "Your Witness").
Hutton played twins in an episode of Have Gun Will Travel as Adam and Sam M.

Director
Hutton made his debut as a director in 1965 with Wild Seed starring Michael Parks.

His first studio film was The Pad and How to Use It (1966) produced by Ross Hunter, shot in 19 days.

Hutton then did Sol Madrid (1967) for producer Elliot Kastner. Kastner hired Hutton to direct Where Eagles Dare, from a screenplay by Alistair MacLean at MGM starring Richard Burton and Clint Eastwood. It was a huge success.

MGM hired Hutton to direct Clint Eastwood again in Kelly's Heroes.

He then directed Elizabeth Taylor in Zee and Co. (1972) and Night Watch (1973). He was going to do Sleep is for the Rich for Kastner but it was never made. In November 1972 Martin Poll announced he would direct The Man Who Loved Cat Dancing but he did not make the final movie.

Retirement
After Night Watch came out in 1973, Hutton stopped making films for seven years because he lost his enthusiasm for it.

Temporary return to filmmaking
He came back at the behest of Elliot Kastner who needed a director to replace Roman Polanski on The First Deadly Sin (1980) with Frank Sinatra. Hutton then made High Road to China (1983) with Tom Selleck.

Hutton retired from making films altogether in the 1980s and began working in real-estate. He died in Los Angeles, California on August 19, 2014, at age 79, a week after suffering a heart attack. He was survived by his wife.

Filmography

References

External links
 
Brian G. Hutton profile, allmovie.com; accessed August 25, 2014.

1935 births
2014 deaths
American male film actors
American male television actors
American film directors
Male actors from New York City
Place of birth missing